Leptobrachium kantonishikawai is a species of frogs in the family Megophryidae from Borneo.

References

kantonishikawai
Amphibians of Borneo
Amphibians described in 2014